Justin Aaron Jackson (born March 28, 1995) is an American professional basketball player for the Texas Legends of the NBA G League. He played basketball in the Homeschool Christian Youth Association (HCYA) and later went on to play college basketball with the North Carolina Tar Heels. The small forward took part in the 2014 McDonald's All-American Boys Game, and was named co-MVP along with Jahlil Okafor.

Jackson was picked fifteenth overall by the Portland Trail Blazers in the 2017 NBA draft before being traded to the Sacramento Kings on draft night. He won an NBA championship with the Milwaukee Bucks in 2021. On February 23, 2023 he joined the Texas Legends for the fourth time.

High school career

Jackson played basketball for Homeschool Christian Youth Association (HCYA), a nonprofit Christian service organization created to serve home school families and students in Houston and the surrounding area. He led the Warriors to a national championship in the 2012 season, and won the Sullivan Award, which is awarded to the top homeschool basketball player of the year. He continued to shine in his final year, averaging 31.5 points and 9.1 rebounds in his successful last season. Jackson became known as one of the most potent high school athletes in the nation which promptly triggered a highly publicized recruitment. He was given offers by Baylor, Georgetown, Maryland, North Carolina, Ohio State, Oklahoma, Oklahoma State, Texas, Texas A&M, Virginia, Virginia Tech, and Washington. Jackson was rated a five-star recruit by Rivals.com, ESPN, and 247Sports.com. Eventually, the small forward signed with North Carolina. He was marked as one of the top players in the Class of 2014.

Following his years with HCYA, Jackson was named to the 2014 McDonald's All-American Boys Game on January 29, 2014. After scoring the first few points of the game, the North Carolina recruit was named co-MVP with Jahlil Okafor. Jackson ended with 23 points off 11-of-12 shooting, making him the game's top scorer. He also won the Jack Daly Award for sportsmanship.

College career
In his freshman season, Jackson was selected to the ACC All-Freshman team and helped his team reach the championship of the 2015 ACC tournament. In his sophomore season, Jackson helped his team win the 2016 ACC tournament and reach the 2016 national championship. In his junior season, Jackson won ACC Player of the Year, was selected as First-team All ACC, and was named a consensus first-team All-American in 2017.

Jackson scored sixteen points and picked up four rebounds in the Tar Heels' sixth championship title in the 2017 NCAA Division I men's basketball tournament.

On April 13, 2017, Jackson declared for the 2017 NBA draft.

Professional career

Sacramento Kings (2017–2019)
Jackson was selected with the 15th overall pick in the 2017 NBA draft by the Portland Trail Blazers. He was traded on draft day, along with Harry Giles, to the Sacramento Kings in exchange for Zach Collins. On July 8, 2017, he signed a 4-year, $13.5 million rookie scale contract with the Kings.

On October 26, 2018, the Kings exercised Jackson's $3.3 million team option for the 2019–20 season.

Dallas Mavericks (2019–2020)
On February 6, 2019, Jackson was traded, along with Zach Randolph, to the Dallas Mavericks in exchange for Harrison Barnes. On September 24, the Mavericks exercised Jackson's $5 million team option for the 2020–21 season.

Oklahoma City Thunder (2020–2021)
On November 27, 2020, Jackson, Trevor Ariza, a 2023 second-round pick (from either Dallas or Miami), and a 2026 second-round pick were traded to the Oklahoma City Thunder in a three-team trade involving the Detroit Pistons. On April 5, 2021, he was waived by the Thunder after 33 appearances.

Milwaukee Bucks (2021)
On April 21, 2021, Jackson signed a two-way contract with the Milwaukee Bucks. He went on to win an NBA championship with the Bucks on July 20, 2021, playing 5 games and averaging 1.2 points per game throughout the 2021 NBA Playoffs. On August 1, the Bucks declined to extend a $1.8 million qualifying offer to Jackson, making him an unrestricted free agent.

Texas Legends (2021)
On October 15, 2021, Jackson returned to the Dallas Mavericks, but was waived a day later. On October 23, he signed with the Texas Legends as an affiliate player, playing 10 games and averaging 22.7 points, 7.7 rebounds, and 2.9 assists.

Boston Celtics (2021)
On December 18, 2021, Jackson signed a 10-day contract with the Boston Celtics.

Phoenix Suns (2022)
On December 29, 2021, Jackson was reacquired and activated by the Texas Legends after his 10-day contract expired. However, he didn't play a game for the team before the Legends started playing again. Jackson took up professional horse racing after the season ended.

On January 5, 2022, Jackson signed a 10-day COVID-19 hardship exemption contract with the Phoenix Suns after waiving Emanuel Terry from the team. During the three games he initially played with the Suns, he averaged 4.3 points and 2.0 rebounds in 7.7 minutes per game in that contract.

Return to the Legends (2022)
After his 10-day contracts expired, Jackson was reacquired by the Texas Legends.

Return to Phoenix (2022)
On February 1, 2022, Jackson signed a second 10-day contract with the Phoenix Suns, this time under an injury exemption. Jackson was then later released on February 10.

Third stint with the Legends (2022)
On February 12, 2022, Jackson was reacquired by the Texas Legends.

Return to the Celtics (2022–2023)
On October 15, 2022, Jackson was signed to the Boston Celtics roster to open the 2022–23 season following a standout performance in the Summer League.

On February 9, 2023, Jackson and two future second-round picks were traded to the Oklahoma City Thunder in exchange for Mike Muscala. Jackson was waived by the Thunder the next day.

Fourth stint with the Legends (2023–present)
On February 23, 2023 the Texas Legends announced that they had acquired Jackson, marking his fourth stint with the team. Jackson will wear jersey number #44.

Career statistics

NBA

Regular season

|-
| style="text-align:left;"|
| style="text-align:left;"|Sacramento
| 68 || 41 || 22.1 || .442 || .308 || .722 || 2.8 || 1.1 || .4|| .2 || 6.7
|-
| style="text-align:left;" rowspan="2"|
| style="text-align:left;"|Sacramento
| 52 || 3 || 20.8 || .424 || .346 || .779 || 2.8 || 1.3 || .4 || .3 || 6.7
|-
| style="text-align:left;"|Dallas
| 29 || 11 || 18.3 || .484 || .372 || .724 || 2.3 || 1.0 || .3 || .0 || 8.2
|-
| style="text-align:left;"|
| style="text-align:left;"|Dallas
| 65 || 3 || 16.1 || .396 || .294 || .840 || 2.4 || .8 || .2 || .2 || 5.5
|-
| style="text-align:left;" rowspan="2"|
| style="text-align:left;"|Oklahoma City
| 33 || 3 || 16.5 || .406 || .306 || .857 || 2.2 || 1.5 || .5 || .1 || 7.2
|-
| style="text-align:left;background:#afe6ba;"|Milwaukee†
| 1 || 0 || 33.0 || .333 || .333 || .500 || 6.0 || 1.0 || .0 || .0 || 9.0
|-
| rowspan=2 style="text-align:left;"|
| style="text-align:left;"|Boston
| 1 || 0 || 2.0 || .000 || – || 1.000 || .0 || .0 || .0 || .0 || 2.0
|-
| style="text-align:left;"|Phoenix
| 6 || 0 || 5.8 || .357|| .333||  –  || 1.2 || .3 || .0 || .0 || 2.2
|-
| style="text-align:left;"|
| style="text-align:left;"|Boston
| 23 || 0 || 4.7 || .259 || .250 || .500 || .7 || .4 || .2 || .2 || .9
|- class="sortbottom"
| style="text-align:center;" colspan="2"|Career
| 278 || 61 || 17.6 || .423 || .319 || .796 || 2.4 || 1.0 || .3 || .2 || 6.0

Playoffs

|-
| style="text-align:left;"|2020
| style="text-align:left;"|Dallas
| 3 || 0 || 5.3 || .167 || .000 || .500 || 1.0 || .0 || .0 || .0 || 1.3
|- class="sortbottom"
| style="text-align:center;" colspan="2"|Career
| 3 || 0 || 5.3 || .167 || .000 || .500 || 1.0 || .0 || .0 || .0 || 1.3

College

|-
| style="text-align:left;"|2014–15
| style="text-align:left;"|North Carolina
| 38 || 37 || 26.7 || .477 || .304 || .710 || 3.7 || 2.3 || .5 || .5 || 10.7
|-
| style="text-align:left;"|2015–16
| style="text-align:left;"|North Carolina
| 40 || 38 || 28.4 || .472 || .298 || .667 || 3.9 || 2.8 || .6 || .4 || 12.7
|-
| style="text-align:left;"|2016–17
| style="text-align:left;"|North Carolina
| 40 || 39 || 32.0 || .443 || .370 || .748 || 4.7 || 2.8 || .8 || .2 || 18.3
|- class="sortbottom"
| style="text-align:center;" colspan="2"|Career
| 118 || 114 || 29.1 || .460 || .340 || .712 || 4.1 || 2.6 || .6 || .4 || 14.0

References

External links

 North Carolina Tar Heels bio
 USA Basketball bio

1995 births
Living people
21st-century African-American sportspeople
African-American basketball players
All-American college men's basketball players
American men's basketball players
Basketball players from Houston
Boston Celtics players
Dallas Mavericks players
McDonald's High School All-Americans
Milwaukee Bucks players
North Carolina Tar Heels men's basketball players
Oklahoma City Thunder players
Parade High School All-Americans (boys' basketball)
Phoenix Suns players
Portland Trail Blazers draft picks
Reno Bighorns players
Sacramento Kings players
Shooting guards
Small forwards
Sportspeople from the Houston metropolitan area
Texas Legends players
United States men's national basketball team players